Christopher Chambers is Professor of Cognitive Neuroscience at Cardiff University, where he is also Head of the CUBRIC Brain Stimulation Group.  He is a Fellow of the British Psychological Society (elected in 2011), and the winner of the society's Spearman Medal in 2007.

Biography
Chambers has a BSc from Monash University (awarded in 1998), and a Ph.D, also from Monash, awarded in 2002.  He was a postdoctoral fellow at the University of Melbourne from 2002 to 2006.

Publications
His most cited papers are 
. According to Google Scholar, this paper has been cited 346 times.
 Cited 335 times.

References

External links
 Christopher Chambers, Cardiff University.

Spearman medal winners
Academics of Cardiff University
British neuroscientists
Psychology educators
Living people
Year of birth missing (living people)